Boris FX is a visual effects and video editing software plug-in developer based in Boston, Massachusetts, USA. The developer is best known for its four flagship products, Continuum (formerly Boris Continuum Complete/BCC), Sapphire, Mocha, and Silhouette.

Boris FX creates plug-in tools for feature film, broadcast television, and multimedia post-production workflows. The plug-ins support a variety of NLEs, including Adobe After Effects and Premiere Pro, Avid Media Composer, Apple Final Cut Pro X, and OFX hosts such as Autodesk Flame, Foundry NUKE, Blackmagic Design DaVinci Resolve and Fusion, and VEGAS Pro.

History 

Boris FX was founded in 1995 by Boris Yamnitsky. The former Media 100 engineer (a member of the original Media 100 launch team in 1993) released “Boris FX,” the first plug-in based digital video effects (DVE) for Adobe Premiere and Media 100, in 1995. The plug-in won Best of Show at Apple Macworld in Boston, MA the same year.

Continuum 
The initial “Boris FX” DVE plug-in created in 1995 has continued to be developed over the years. The product was renamed Boris Continuum Complete (BCC) in 2001 and was most recently rebranded as Continuum. Various Boris Continuum versions were bundled with Avid Media Composer since 2004. 

In October 2015, Boris FX released Continuum (v10), the first product release since the Imagineer Systems acquisition. Continuum (v10) introduced integrated Mocha planar tracking and masking tools into the collection. In October 2017, the company released Continuum (v11), which includes Academy Award-nominated Primatte tech, and a new 360/VR Unit for editing tasks.

Particle Illusion 

As part of the merger with GenArts in 2016, Boris FX acquired the rights to the Particle Illusion (formerly particleIllusion) product, a storied particle system from the original developer Alan Lorence, the founder of Wondertouch. In 2018, Boris FX released a redesigned version of the product to a larger NLE/compositing market as part of Continuum (2019). The new Particle Illusion plug-in supports Adobe, Avid, and many OFX hosts.

Final Effects Complete 
In June 2005, Boris FX expanded its product line by acquiring Final Effects Complete from the Israeli software company Optibase. Final Effects Complete, featuring over 100 VFX plug-ins is available as a separate package for Adobe After Effects, Premiere Pro, and Avid Media Composer.

Media 100 
In October 2005, Yamnitsky acquired Media 100 the company that launched his plug-in career. Boris FX had a long relationship with Media 100 which bundled Boris RED software as its main titling and compositing solution. Media 100’s video editing software is now available free to Mac OS users.

Mocha 
In December 2014, Boris FX merged with Imagineer Systems, the UK-based developer of the Academy Award-winning planar motion tracking software, Mocha Pro. Mocha Pro’s features include planar tracking (motion tracking), rotoscoping, image stabilization, 3D camera tracking, and object removal. In June 2016, Mocha released (v5) which introduced Mocha Pro’s tools as plug-ins for Adobe After Effects and Premiere Pro, Avid Media Composer, and OFX hosts Foundry’s NUKE, Blackmagic Design Fusion, VEGAS Pro, and HitFilm for the first time.

Mocha’s product line also includes a lite-version of Mocha bundled with Adobe After Effects Creative Cloud known as Mocha AE. Mocha AE has been included with every version of After Effects since CS4. The lite-version of Mocha is also bundled with HitFilm Pro from FXhome. Mocha’s tracking SDK (software developers kit) is also licensed to other VFX products including SAM Quantel Pablo Rio, Silhouette FX, CoreMelt, and Motion VFX. In February 2017, Boris FX launched Mocha VR, based on Mocha’s planar tracking and masking tools. Mocha VR is the first 360-optimized plug-in for Adobe After Effects, Premiere Pro, Avid Media Composer. and OFX Hosts: Nuke, Fusion & Vegas Pro.

Mocha Pro has been used on major films and television shows including Birdman, Black Swan, the Harry Potter series, The Hobbit, and Star Wars.

Sapphire 
In September 2016, Boris FX merged with former competitor, GenArts, developer of Sapphire high-end visual effects plug-ins. In March 2017, Sapphire released eight individual Sapphire Units based on separate effect categories. In October 2017, Boris FX released its first new version of Sapphire since the GenArts acquisition. Sapphire (v11) now includes integrated Mocha tracking and masking tools. Sapphire is available for Adobe, Avid, the Autodesk Flame family, and OFX hosts including Blackmagic DaVinci Resolve and Fusion, and Foundry’s NUKE. As part of the merger, Boris FX acquired the rights to Particle Illusion. In 2018, Boris FX reintroduced the product to the larger NLE/Compositing market.

Sapphire’s plug-ins have been used on major films including Avatar, the Harry Potter and the Prisoner of Azkaban, Iron Man, The Lord of the Rings, The Matrix trilogy, Titanic, and X-Men.

Silhouette 
In September 2019, Boris FX merged with SilhouetteFX, Academy Award-winning developer of Silhouette, a high-end digital paint, advanced rotoscoping, motion tracking, and node-based compositing application for visual effects in film post-production. In November 2019, Boris FX released Silhouette 2020 which includes free built-in Mocha planar tracking, new rotoscoping tools such as magnetic splines and a visual overlay preview, three new paint brushes, and a paint detail separation workflow. In April 2020, Boris FX released the new Silhouette Paint plug-in product for Adobe, Autodesk, Nuke, and other OFX hosts.

Silhouette has been used on major films including Avatar, Avengers: Infinity War, Blade Runner 2049, Ex Machina, and Interstellar.

Digital Film Tools 
In September 2019, Boris FX merged with Digital Film Tools,  developer of Digital Film Tools plug-ins for photographers and visual effects artists. Its toolkit includes specialized camera lenses, film stock and grains, lens flares, and lighting gels. Digital Film Tools is available as a standalone application and a plug-in for Adobe Photoshop, Adobe After Effects, Adobe Premiere Pro, Apple Final Cut Pro, Avid, and OFX hosts Blackmagic DaVinci Resolve, Foundry Nuke, and VEGAS Pro.

Awards

1995 
 Boris FX, Mac World, Digital Video Magazine, Best of Show Award

2013 
 Imagineer Systems, Academy Awards, Scientific and Engineering Award
 Soundbite, Studio Daily Prime Award

2016 
 Continuum, Post Magazine, NAB 2016 Post Pick

2017 
 Boris FX, Boris Yamnitsky, Digital Video Industry Innovator Award
 Mocha VR, Post Magazine, NAB 2017 Post Pick
 Mocha VR, Digital Video, 2017 NAB Best of Show Award Winner

2018 
 Mocha VR, Advanced Imaging Society, 2018 Lumiere Technology Award

2019 

 Silhouette, Academy Awards, Scientific and Engineering Award
 Sapphire, Engineering Emmy Award
 Mocha Pro, Engineering Emmy Award
 Silhouette, Engineering Emmy Award

References 

Video editing software
Software companies based in Massachusetts
Software companies of the United States
Technology companies established in 1995
1995 establishments in Massachusetts